Louis Comyns (17 August 1904  – 10 February 1962) was a British Labour Party politician and a general practitioner.

Born in Glasgow into a Jewish family, Comyns worked as a doctor from 1932.

Comyns was elected to the House of Commons at the 1945 general election, as Member of Parliament for the Silvertown constituency in the East End of London.  He served until the 1950 general election, when the constituency was abolished in boundary changes.  He then served on West Ham Borough Council.

References

References

External links 
 

1904 births
1962 deaths
Scottish Jews
Jewish British politicians
Labour Party (UK) MPs for English constituencies
UK MPs 1945–1950
Politicians from Glasgow
20th-century British medical doctors
Scottish general practitioners